Eucereon reniferum is a moth in the subfamily Arctiinae. It was described by George Hampson in 1898. It is found in the Amazon region.

References

reniforum
Moths described in 1898